German Sport Guns GmbH is a German firearm manufacturer.  Their company focus is on .22 LR firearms, intended for sport shooting and plinking.  Its products are copies or replicas of famous military firearms, but are often subject to much less legal scrutiny because of the cartridge they use.  Additionally, .22 LR is often less than 1/10 the price of centerfire ammunition, making it a cost-effective way to teach shooting skills and recreational shooting. The company also produces airsoft replicas.

Products

 GSG-5, GSG-522, GSG-16, a .22 lookalike of the Heckler & Koch MP5
 GSG G14 , a different version of a G36C
 GSG AK-47, a .22 lookalike of the Kalashnikov AK-47 and its derivatives. As of 2020, GSG offers seven variants of this series, including the “Rebel,” which is meant to replicate the appearance of an AK-style firearm in guerrilla warfare
 GSG-1911, a .22 copy of the Browning M1911 pistol
 GSG-StG 44, a .22 copy of the StG 44
 GSG-MP40P, a 9mm, semi-automatic pistol lookalike of the MP 40 submachine gun
 GSG FireFly, license produced SIG Sauer Mosquito, a downsized copy of the SIG Sauer P226 chambered in .22 lr.
 GSG-themed clothing

References

External links
 Website of American Tactical Imports, GSG's U.S. importer and distributor

Companies based in North Rhine-Westphalia
Firearm manufacturers of Germany
2002 establishments in Germany
Manufacturing companies established in 2002
Companies established in 2002
Lüke & Ortmeier Gruppe